Juab may refer to:

 Juab County, Utah
Juab, Utah, an unincorporated community in Juab County
the Juab Valley, in Juab County
Juab High School
Juab School District
Juab County Jail